Estonian Skating Union (abbreviation ESU) is one of the sport governing bodies in Estonia which deals with figure skating and speed skating.

ESU is established on 23 January 1991 and is one of the successor of Estonian Winter Sport Union, which was established in 1921. ESU is a member of International Skating Union (ISU).

References

External links
 

Sports governing bodies in Estonia
Ice skating in Estonia
National governing bodies for ice skating
Sports organizations established in 1921